The world's oceans are warming due to climate change. Climate change is caused by three major factors which are the greenhouse effect, variation in the sun's energy that reaches Earth, and changes in reflectivity within Earth's atmosphere and its surface. The greenhouse effect is caused by greenhouse gases that absorb sunlight. Energy from the sun that reaches Earth is either retained or sent into space. Greenhouse gases in Earth's atmosphere such as carbon dioxide, methane, and water vapor absorb energy which cause a blanketing effect that warms the earth. Aerosols such as black carbon also catalyze the warming effect as they are unreflective and absorb energy from the sun supplementing greenhouse gases in the warming effect.

These combined factors are warming the Earth's land as well as the oceans. Many fish species possess a certain range of water temperature that they are able to tolerate which is causing species to migrate to different areas where the water temperature is livable. The warming of the Atlantic Ocean is causing many fish species to shift north towards once cooler waters so they can live within their temperature range. Tropical species are being found outside their normal range and into more northern waters causing an array of ecological, economic, and fishery management problems.

Research
Cheung and his colleagues were able to get these estimates by using the mean temperature of catch. They used data from 990 species within 52 marine ecosystems from 1970-2006. Using fisheries data and computer models, Cheung was able to estimate the shift of species. The study predicted that there will be a 60% shift of species towards northern waters within the next 41 years.

Species shifting north
Atlantic surf clams that were once common off the coasts of Delaware, Virginia, and Maryland are now rare, but are now more common in deeper waters off the coast of New England.
 Red Mullet that were common in the Mediterranean are now found in the North Sea off the Coast of Great Britain and Norway.
 Species of Triggerfish and Grouper from the Gulf of Mexico are now being caught in Mid-Atlantic waters.
 Lionfish native to the western Pacific are invasive species in the Gulf of Mexico but are now being found off the coast of North Carolina.

Potential issues

 The Northern Shrimp population may decline in the future. The shrimp larvae hatching period is dependent upon certain temperatures. Once the larvae hatch, they feed on an annual algal bloom. There is a strong correlation between the larvae hatching and when the algal bloom occurs. The changing ocean temperature may result in a mismatch in time with the larvae and algal bloom which could cause a decline in the Northern shrimp population.
 The Red mullet migration into the northern Atlantic could catalyze the decline of cod. Red mullet could outcompete Cod, eventually replacing the species. Emily Pidgeon, the senior director of strategic marine initiatives at Conservation International, stated that the worldwide cod population could decrease by almost half by 2050.

References

Animal migration
Biota of the Atlantic Ocean